Oncoceras is a genus of oncocerids, family Oncoceratidae from the middle and upper Ordovician of North America and Europe.

The shell, or conch, of Oncoceras is relatively short, a curved, compressed brevicone with a maximum width in the phragmocone just behind the body chamber, narrowing toward the aperture. The siphuncle is small, necks recurved.

References

 Waltre C. Sweet, 1964. Nautiloidea-Oncocerida. Treatise on Invertebrate Paleontology, Part K. Geological Society of America.

Prehistoric nautiloid genera
Ordovician cephalopods
Middle Ordovician first appearances
Late Ordovician extinctions
Paleozoic life of the Northwest Territories
Paleozoic life of Quebec